The 2023 New York Yankees season will be the 121st season for the New York Yankees franchise. The Yankees are scheduled to begin the season on March 30 against the San Francisco Giants at home and will end the season on the road against the Kansas City Royals.

After the Yankees re-signed general manager Brian Cashman in December 2022, the team announced Brian Sabean as executive adviser to Cashman on January 2, 2023. Sabean spent 30 seasons with the San Francisco Giants (four as executive vice president), leading the organization to three World Series rings in the 2010s. He previously spent eight seasons with the Yankees, first joining as a scout in 1985, then as the Yankees director of scouting from 1986 through 1990. Lastly, as vice president of player development and scouting from 1990 through 1992.

Offseason

Rule changes 
Pursuant to the CBA, new rule changes will be in place for the 2023 season:

 institution of a pitch clock between pitches;
 limits on pickoff attempts per plate appearance;
 limits on defensive shifts requiring two infielders to be on either side of second and be within the boundary of the infield; and
 larger bases (increased to 18-inch squares);

Transactions

2022
November 15 – re-signed Anthony Rizzo to a 2-year, $34 million contract in free agency with a $17 million club option or $6 million buyout for the 2025 season (total of $51 million).
November 18 – re-signed Isiah Kiner-Falefa to a 1-year, $6 million contract.
November 18 – claimed right-handed relief pitcher Junior Fernández off waivers from the Pittsburgh Pirates.
 December 6 – signed right-handed relief pitcher Tommy Kahnle from the Los Angeles Dodgers to a 2-year, $11.5 million free-agent contact.
December 7 – re-signed Aaron Judge to a 9-year, $360 million contract.
December 15 – signed left-handed starting pitcher Carlos Rodón from the San Francisco Giants to a 6-year, $162 million contract.
December 28 – traded relief pitcher Lucas Luetge to the Atlanta Braves for right-handed pitcher Indigo Diaz and infielder Caleb Durbin.

2023
January 29 – re-signed second baseman Gleyber Torres to a 1-year, $9.95 million contract to avoid arbitration.

Regular season

Game log

|- style="background: 
| 1 || March 30 || Giants || – || || || — || Yankee Stadium || || – 
|- style="background: 
| 2 || April 1 || Giants || – || || || — || Yankee Stadium || || –
|- style="background: 
| 3 || April 2 || Giants || – || || || — || Yankee Stadium || || –
|- style="background: 
| 4 || April 3 || Phillies || – || || || — || Yankee Stadium || || –
|- style="background: 
| 5 || April 4 || Phillies || – || || || — || Yankee Stadium || || –
|- style="background: 
| 6 || April 5 || Phillies || – || || || — || Yankee Stadium || || –
|- style="background: 
| 7 || April 6 || @ Orioles || – || || || — || Camden Yards || || –
|- style="background: 
| 8 || April 8 || @ Orioles || – || || || — || Camden Yards || || –
|- style="background: 
| 9 || April 9 || @ Orioles || – || || || — || Camden Yards || || –
|- style="background: 
| 10 || April 10 || @ Guardians || – || || || — || Progressive Field || || –
|- style="background: 
| 11 || April 11 || @ Guardians || – || || || — || Progressive Field || || –
|- style="background: 
| 12 || April 12 || @ Guardians || – || || || — || Progressive Field || || –
|- style="background: 
| 13 || April 13 || Twins || – || || || — || Yankee Stadium || || –
|- style="background: 
| 14 || April 14 || Twins || – || || || — || Yankee Stadium || || –
|- style="background: 
| 15 || April 15 || Twins || – || || || — || Yankee Stadium || || –
|- style="background: 
| 16 || April 16 || Twins || – || || || — || Yankee Stadium || || –
|- style="background: 
| 17 || April 18 || Angels || – || || || — || Yankee Stadium || || –
|- style="background: 
| 18 || April 19 || Angels || – || || || — || Yankee Stadium || || –
|- style="background: 
| 19 || April 20 || Angels || – || || || — || Yankee Stadium || || –
|- style="background: 
| 20 || April 21 || Blue Jays || – || || || — || Yankee Stadium || || –
|- style="background: 
| 21 || April 22 || Blue Jays || – || || || — || Yankee Stadium || || –
|- style="background: 
| 22 || April 23 || Blue Jays || – || || || — || Yankee Stadium || || –
|- style="background: 
| 23 || April 24 || @ Twins || – || || || — || Target Field || || –
|- style="background: 
| 24 || April 25 || @ Twins || – || || || — || Target Field || || –
|- style="background: 
| 25 || April 26 || @ Twins || – || || || — || Target Field || || –
|- style="background: 
| 26 || April 27 || @ Rangers || – || || || — || Globe Life Field || || –
|- style="background: 
| 27 || April 28 || @ Rangers || – || || || — || Globe Life Field || || –
|- style="background: 
| 28 || April 29 || @ Rangers || – || || || — || Globe Life Field || || –
|- style="background: 
| 29 || April 30 || @ Rangers || – || || || — || Globe Life Field || || –
|- 
 

|- style="background: 
| 30 || May 1 || Guardians || – || || || — || Yankee Stadium || || –
|- style="background: 
| 31 || May 2 || Guardians || – || || || — || Yankee Stadium || || –
|- style="background: 
| 32 || May 3 || Guardians || – || || || — || Yankee Stadium || || –
|- style="background: 
| 33 || May 5 || @ Rays || – || || || — || Tropicana Field || || –
|- style="background: 
| 34 || May 6 || @ Rays || – || || || — || Tropicana Field || || –
|- style="background: 
| 35 || May 7 || @ Rays || – || || || — || Tropicana Field || || –
|- style="background: 
| 36 || May 8 || Athletics || – || || || — || Yankee Stadium || || –
|- style="background: 
| 37 || May 9 || Athletics || – || || || — || Yankee Stadium || || –
|- style="background: 
| 38 || May 10 || Athletics || – || || || — || Yankee Stadium || || –
|- style="background: 
| 39 || May 11 || Rays || – || || || — || Yankee Stadium || || –
|- style="background: 
| 40 || May 12 || Rays || – || || || — || Yankee Stadium || || –
|- style="background: 
| 41 || May 13 || Rays || – || || || — || Yankee Stadium || || –
|- style="background: 
| 42 || May 14 || Rays || – || || || — || Yankee Stadium || || –
|- style="background: 
| 43 || May 15 || @ Blue Jays || – || || || — || Rogers Centre || || –
|- style="background: 
| 44 || May 16 || @ Blue Jays || – || || || — || Rogers Centre || || –
|- style="background: 
| 45 || May 17 || @ Blue Jays || – || || || — || Rogers Centre || || –
|- style="background: 
| 46 || May 18 || @ Blue Jays || – || || || — || Rogers Centre || || –
|- style="background: 
| 47 || May 19 || @ Reds || – || || || — || Great American Ball Park || || –
|- style="background: 
| 48 || May 20 || @ Reds || – || || || — || Great American Ball Park || || –
|- style="background: 
| 49 || May 21 || @ Reds || – || || || — || Great American Ball Park || || –
|- style="background: 
| 50 || May 23 || Orioles || – || || || — || Yankee Stadium || || –
|- style="background: 
| 51 || May 24 || Orioles || – || || || — || Yankee Stadium || || –
|- style="background: 
| 52 || May 25 || Orioles || – || || || — || Yankee Stadium || || –
|- style="background: 
| 53 || May 26 || Padres || – || || || — || Yankee Stadium || || –
|- style="background: 
| 54 || May 27 || Padres || – || || || — || Yankee Stadium || || –
|- style="background: 
| 55 || May 28 || Padres || – || || || — || Yankee Stadium || || –
|- style="background: 
| 56 || May 29 || @ Mariners || – || || || — || T-Mobile Park || || –
|- style="background: 
| 57 || May 30 || @ Mariners || – || || || — || T-Mobile Park || || –
|- style="background: 
| 58 || May 31 || @ Mariners || – || || || — || T-Mobile Park || || –
|- 
 

|- style="background: 
| 59 || June 2 || @ Dodgers || – || || || — || Dodger Stadium || || –
|- style="background: 
| 60 || June 3 || @ Dodgers || – || || || — || Dodger Stadium || || –
|- style="background: 
| 61 || June 4 || @ Dodgers || – || || || — || Dodger Stadium || || –
|- style="background: 
| 62 || June 6 || White Sox || – || || || — || Yankee Stadium || || –
|- style="background: 
| 63 || June 7 || White Sox || – || || || — || Yankee Stadium || || –
|- style="background: 
| 64 || June 8 || White Sox || – || || || — || Yankee Stadium || || –
|- style="background: 
| 65 || June 9 || Red Sox || – || || || — || Yankee Stadium || || –
|- style="background: 
| 66 || June 10 || Red Sox || – || || || — || Yankee Stadium || || –
|- style="background: 
| 67 || June 11 || Red Sox || – || || || — || Yankee Stadium || || –
|- style="background: 
| 68 || June 13 || @ Mets || – || || || — || Citi Field || || –
|- style="background: 
| 69 || June 14 || @ Mets || – || || || — || Citi Field || || –
|- style="background: 
| 70 || June 16 || @ Red Sox || – || || || — || Fenway Park || || –
|- style="background: 
| 71 || June 17 || @ Red Sox || – || || || — || Fenway Park || || –
|- style="background: 
| 72 || June 18 || @ Red Sox || – || || || — || Fenway Park || || –
|- style="background: 
| 73 || June 20 || Mariners || – || || || — || Yankee Stadium || || –
|- style="background: 
| 74 || June 21 || Mariners || – || || || — || Yankee Stadium || || –
|- style="background: 
| 75 || June 22 || Mariners || – || || || — || Yankee Stadium || || –
|- style="background: 
| 76 || June 23 || Rangers || – || || || — || Yankee Stadium || || –
|- style="background: 
| 77 || June 24 || Rangers || – || || || — || Yankee Stadium || || –
|- style="background: 
| 78 || June 25 || Rangers || – || || || — || Yankee Stadium || || –
|- style="background: 
| 79 || June 27 || @ Athletics || – || || || — || Oakland Coliseum || || –
|- style="background: 
| 80 || June 28 || @ Athletics || – || || || — || Oakland Coliseum || || –
|- style="background: 
| 81 || June 29 || @ Athletics || – || || || — || Oakland Coliseum || || –
|- style="background: 
| 82 || June 30 || @ Cardinals || – || || || — || Busch Stadium || || –
|- 
 

|- style="background: 
| 83 || July 1 || @ Cardinals || – || || || — || Busch Stadium || || –
|- style="background: 
| 84 || July 2 || @ Cardinals || – || || || — || Busch Stadium || || –
|- style="background: 
| 85 || July 3 || Orioles || – || || || — || Yankee Stadium || || –
|- style="background: 
| 86 || July 4 || Orioles || – || || || — || Yankee Stadium || || –
|- style="background: 
| 87 || July 5 || Orioles || – || || || — || Yankee Stadium || || –
|- style="background: 
| 88 || July 6 || Orioles || – || || || — || Yankee Stadium || || –
|- style="background: 
| 89 || July 7 || Cubs || – || || || — || Yankee Stadium || || –
|- style="background: 
| 90 || July 8 || Cubs || – || || || — || Yankee Stadium || || –
|- style="background: 
| 91 || July 9 || Cubs || – || || || — || Yankee Stadium || || –
|-style=background:#bff
|colspan="10"|93rd All-Star Game in Seattle, Washington
|- style="background: 
| 92 || July 14 || @ Rockies || – || || || — || Coors Field || || –
|- style="background: 
| 93 || July 15 || @ Rockies || – || || || — || Coors Field || || –
|- style="background: 
| 94 || July 16 || @ Rockies || – || || || — || Coors Field || || –
|- style="background: 
| 95 || July 17 || @ Angels || – || || || — || Angel Stadium || || –
|- style="background: 
| 96 || July 18 || @ Angels || – || || || — || Angel Stadium || || –
|- style="background: 
| 97 || July 19 || @ Angels || – || || || — || Angel Stadium || || –
|- style="background: 
| 98 || July 21 || Royals || – || || || — || Yankee Stadium || || –
|- style="background: 
| 99 || July 22 || Royals || – || || || — || Yankee Stadium || || –
|- style="background: 
| 100 || July 23 || Royals || – || || || — || Yankee Stadium || || –
|- style="background: 
| 101 || July 25 || Mets || – || || || — || Yankee Stadium || || –
|- style="background: 
| 102 || July 26 || Mets || – || || || — || Yankee Stadium || || –
|- style="background: 
| 103 || July 28 || @ Orioles || – || || || — || Camden Yards || || –
|- style="background: 
| 104 || July 29 || @ Orioles || – || || || — || Camden Yards || || –
|- style="background: 
| 105 || July 30 || @ Orioles || – || || || — || Camden Yards || || –
|- style="background: 
| 106 || July 31 || Rays || – || || || — || Yankee Stadium || || –
|- 
 

|- style="background: 
| 107 || August 1 || Rays || – || || || — || Yankee Stadium || || –
|- style="background: 
| 108 || August 2 || Rays || – || || || — || Yankee Stadium || || –
|- style="background: 
| 109 || August 3 || Astros || – || || || — || Yankee Stadium || || –
|- style="background: 
| 110 || August 4 || Astros || – || || || — || Yankee Stadium || || –
|- style="background: 
| 111 || August 5 || Astros || – || || || — || Yankee Stadium || || –
|- style="background: 
| 112 || August 6 || Astros || – || || || — || Yankee Stadium || || –
|- style="background: 
| 113 || August 7 || @ White Sox || – || || || — || Guaranteed Rate Field || || –
|- style="background: 
| 114 || August 8 || @ White Sox || – || || || — || Guaranteed Rate Field || || –
|- style="background: 
| 115 || August 9 || @ White Sox || – || || || — || Guaranteed Rate Field || || –
|- style="background: 
| 116 || August 11 || @ Marlins || – || || || — || LoanDepot Park || || –
|- style="background: 
| 117 || August 12 || @ Marlins || – || || || — || LoanDepot Park || || –
|- style="background: 
| 118 || August 13 || @ Marlins || – || || || — || LoanDepot Park || || –
|- style="background: 
| 119 || August 14 || @ Braves || – || || || — || Truist Park || || –
|- style="background: 
| 120 || August 15 || @ Braves || – || || || — || Truist Park || || –
|- style="background: 
| 121 || August 16 || @ Braves || – || || || — || Truist Park || || –
|- style="background: 
| 122 || August 18 || Red Sox || – || || || — || Yankee Stadium || || –
|- style="background: 
| 123 || August 19 || Red Sox || – || || || — || Yankee Stadium || || –
|- style="background: 
| 124 || August 20 || Red Sox || – || || || — || Yankee Stadium || || –
|- style="background: 
| 125 || August 22 || Nationals || – || || || — || Yankee Stadium || || –
|- style="background: 
| 126 || August 23 || Nationals || – || || || — || Yankee Stadium || || –
|- style="background: 
| 127 || August 24 || Nationals || – || || || — || Yankee Stadium || || –
|- style="background: 
| 128 || August 25 || @ Rays || – || || || — || Tropicana Field || || –
|- style="background: 
| 129 || August 26 || @ Rays || – || || || — || Tropicana Field || || –
|- style="background: 
| 130 || August 27 || @ Rays || – || || || — || Tropicana Field || || –
|- style="background: 
| 131 || August 28 || @ Tigers || – || || || — || Comerica Park || || –
|- style="background: 
| 132 || August 29 || @ Tigers || – || || || — || Comerica Park || || –
|- style="background: 
| 133 || August 30 || @ Tigers || – || || || — || Comerica Park || || –
|- style="background: 
| 134 || August 31 || @ Tigers || – || || || — || Comerica Park || || –
|- 
 

|- style="background: 
| 135 || September 1 || @ Astros || – || || || — || Minute Maid Park || || –
|- style="background: 
| 136 || September 2 || @ Astros || – || || || — || Minute Maid Park || || –
|- style="background: 
| 137 || September 3 || @ Astros || – || || || — || Minute Maid Park || || –
|- style="background: 
| 138 || September 5 || Tigers || – || || || — || Yankee Stadium || || –
|- style="background: 
| 139 || September 6 || Tigers || – || || || — || Yankee Stadium || || –
|- style="background: 
| 140 || September 7 || Tigers || – || || || — || Yankee Stadium || || –
|- style="background: 
| 141 || September 8 || Brewers || – || || || — || Yankee Stadium || || –
|- style="background: 
| 142 || September 9 || Brewers || – || || || — || Yankee Stadium || || –
|- style="background: 
| 143 || September 10 || Brewers || – || || || — || Yankee Stadium || || –
|- style="background: 
| 144 || September 11 || @ Red Sox || – || || || — || Fenway Park || || –
|- style="background: 
| 145 || September 12 || @ Red Sox || – || || || — || Fenway Park || || –
|- style="background: 
| 146 || September 13 || @ Red Sox || – || || || — || Fenway Park || || –
|- style="background: 
| 147 || September 14 || @ Red Sox || – || || || — || Fenway Park || || –
|- style="background: 
| 148 || September 15 || @ Pirates || – || || || — || PNC Park || || –
|- style="background: 
| 149 || September 16 || @ Pirates || – || || || — || PNC Park || || –
|- style="background: 
| 150 || September 17 || @ Pirates || – || || || — || PNC Park || || –
|- style="background: 
| 151 || September 19 || Blue Jays || – || || || — || Yankee Stadium || || –
|- style="background: 
| 152 || September 20 || Blue Jays || – || || || — || Yankee Stadium || || –
|- style="background: 
| 153 || September 21 || Blue Jays || – || || || — || Yankee Stadium || || –
|- style="background: 
| 154 || September 22 || Diamondbacks || – || || || — || Yankee Stadium || || –
|- style="background: 
| 155 || September 23 || Diamondbacks || – || || || — || Yankee Stadium || || –
|- style="background: 
| 156 || September 24 || Diamondbacks || – || || || — || Yankee Stadium || || –
|- style="background: 
| 157 || September 26 || @ Blue Jays || – || || || — || Rogers Centre || || –
|- style="background: 
| 158 || September 27 || @ Blue Jays || – || || || — || Rogers Centre || || –
|- style="background: 
| 159 || September 28 || @ Blue Jays || – || || || — || Rogers Centre || || –
|- style="background: 
| 160 || September 29 || @ Royals || – || || || — || Kauffman Stadium || || –
|- style="background: 
| 161 || September 30 || @ Royals || – || || || — || Kauffman Stadium || || –
|- style="background: 
| 162 || October 1 || @ Royals || – || || || — || Kauffman Stadium || || –
|-

Season standings

American League East

Current roster

Farm system

References

External links
2023 New York Yankees season at Baseball Reference
2023 New York Yankees schedule

New York Yankees seasons
New York Yankees
New York Yankees
2020s in the Bronx